Camilla Alessio (born 23 July 2001) is an Italian professional racing cyclist, who currently rides for UCI Women's Continental Team .

References

External links
 

2001 births
Living people
Italian female cyclists
Cyclists from the Province of Padua
People from Cittadella
21st-century Italian women